Bert Grimm (born Edward Cecil Reardon, later known as Bertram Cecil Grimm, February 8, 1900 – June 15, 1985) was an American tattoo artist considered the "grandfather of old school". Grimm's work contributed to the development and popularity of the American Traditional tattoo style. He tattooed Bonnie and Clyde and Pretty Boy Floyd, among others.

Personal life
Edward Cecil Reardon was born in Springfield, Missouri to John Elmer Reardon (1862–1945) and his wife Carrie Elizabeth Shull Reardon (1863–1923), one of twelve children. He grew up in Portland, Oregon. At some point he changed his name to Bertram Cecil Grimm. He married Julia Florence Lechler (1910–1984) on February 7, 1931. Grimm died 15 June 1985 in Warrenton, Oregon.

Career

Early in his professional career, he spent a season with the Buffalo Bill Wild West Show. Grimm opened his first tattoo store in Chicago in 1916. Over the years, he operated stores in Honolulu, Salt Lake City, Las Vegas, Seattle, Los Angeles, Long Beach, St. Louis, Portland, and coastal Oregon and China.

His shop in Long Beach, at the Nu-Pike, was later owned by Bob Shaw. Proximity to the Long Beach Naval Shipyard, and its many sailors on extended leave during retrofitting, supported an ink economy because of the tradition of sailor tattoos. Kari Barba purchased Grimm's shop in 2003.

Grimm was a promoter of Ben Corday, Lyle Tuttle and Ed Hardy.

References

Further reading
 Margo De Mello: Inked: Tattoos and Body Art around the World. ABC-CLIO 2014, ISBN 1-61069-076-1, p. 252
 Jason Brooks: Legends: Tattoo Flash Book. Greg Geisler 2013, ISBN 0-615-76726-5
 Thomas Albright: Art in the San Francisco Bay Area, 1945-1980: An Illustrated History. University of California Press 1985, ISBN 0-520-05193-9, p. 319

American tattoo artists